Serve Georgia is a Georgian politician party. It was founded by Murman Dumbadze and Medea Vasadze on July 25 2016. After 2018 party is member of  Strength Is in Unity. Motto of party is: „Strong Adjara, strong Georgia”. Party isn't a member of parliament.

Results in elections

References 

 http://www.facebook.com/emsaxuresaqartvelos
 http://ajaratv.ge/news/ge/3559/emsakhure-saqartvelos--.html
 http://liberali.ge/news/view/38430/10-opozitsiuri-partia-gaertianda-da-modzraoba-dzala-ertobashia-daafudzna

Political parties in Georgia (country)
Political parties established in 2016